The Fisher Dakota Hawk is a Canadian side-by-side two-seat, conventional landing gear, single-engined, high-wing monoplane kit aircraft designed for construction by amateur builders.

Fisher Flying Products was originally based in Edgeley, North Dakota, USA but the company is now located in Dorchester, Ontario, Canada.

Development
The Dakota Hawk was designed by Fisher Aircraft in the United States in 1993 and was intended to comply with the US Experimental - Amateur-built category, although it qualifies as ultralight aircraft in some countries, such as Canada. It also qualifies as US Experimental Light Sport Aircraft.

The construction of the Dakota Hawk is of wood, with a wooden geodesic-construction fuselage and an I-beam wing spar. The wings, tail and fuselage are covered with doped aircraft fabric. The aircraft wing has "V" struts and jury struts. The Dakota Hawk's main landing gear uses bungee suspension with hydraulic brakes and wheel pants available as options. The tail wheel is steerable and the wings fold for storage or trailering. The company claims an amateur builder can complete either aircraft from the kit in 600 hours.

The specified engines for the Dakota Hawk include the following four-stroke aircraft engines:
 Continental A65
 Rotax 912UL
 Continental C85
 Continental O-200
 Rotax 912ULS
 Jabiru 3300

Specifications (Dakota Hawk)

See also

References

External links

Official website
Photo of Dakota Hawk on Airliners.net

1990s Canadian ultralight aircraft
Light-sport aircraft
Aircraft first flown in 1993
High-wing aircraft
Single-engined tractor aircraft